Thomas Coring (dates unknown) was an English organist.

Career
Coring was a Lay Vicar of Chichester Cathedral. He was employed as the Organist from midsummer 1550 and is thought to have been replaced by 1557, as the cathedral records list him as a singer. He resumed his position in 1561.

See also
 Organs and organists of Chichester Cathedral

References

Cathedral organists
Year of birth missing
Year of death missing
English organists
British male organists
Male classical organists